Dharmasraya Regency is a regency (kabupaten) of West Sumatra province, Indonesia. It covers an area of 2,961.13 km2 and had a population of 191,422 at the 2010 Census and 228,591 at the 2020 Census. The administrative centre is the town of Pulau Punjung. In the past, this regency was the location of an independent Kingdom of Dharmasraya, which came to power in the 11th century.

Administrative districts

Dharmasraya Regency is divided into eleven districts (kecamatan), listed below with their areas and their populations at the 2010 Census and the 2020 Census. The table also includes the locations of the district administrative centres.

References

Regencies of West Sumatra